Suisun–Fairfield station is an Amtrak station in Suisun City, California. It serves both Suisun City and nearby Fairfield. It is served by the Amtrak Capitol Corridor commuter rail line between Auburn and San Jose through Oakland. Connecting bus service is provided by Fairfield and Suisun Transit, SolTrans, Rio Vista Delta Breeze, and VINE Transit. The station is under the State Route 12 overpass.

The current station opened in March 1914 and is the second depot to serve these two towns. The one-story wood-frame depot is one of two dozen “colonnade style” stations erected by the Southern Pacific Railroad. The design takes its name from the Tuscan columns used in the long porch that stretches out along the platform. Beneath its wide roof, passengers are protected from inclement weather. The colonnade style mixed elements of Colonial Revival and Arts and Crafts architecture.

In the 1970s, the depot fell into disrepair, but in the 1990s, in an effort to create a more inviting gateway to town, the Suisun City Redevelopment Authority gained control of the structure and used state transportation funds to carry out a full rehabilitation, which included a new landscaped courtyard.

Until 1998, the California Zephyr also stopped here. It also served the Spirit of California until it was discontinued in 1983.

References

External links 

Suisun–Fairfield, CA – Capitol Corridor
Suisun–Fairfield, CA – USA RailGuide (TrainWeb)

Railway stations in Solano County, California
Railway stations in the United States opened in 1904
Former Southern Pacific Railroad stations in California
Amtrak stations in California